"Beach 2k20" is a song by Swedish singer-songwriter Robyn, recorded for her eighth studio album Honey. It was released as the fifth single from the album on 4 September 2019 with a remix by Yaeji. A remix by Louie Vega followed on 17 July 2020.

Composition
Described as a "deadpan house banger" and "one of the most lyrically inane songs of Robyn's career", the song "attempt[s] to capture the exact feelings of just chilling somewhere tropical and quietly enjoying yourself". It features a sample of Timmy Thomas's "Why Can't We Live Together", as well as a musical reference to Robyn's debut "Show Me Love". "Beach 2k20" features "jazzy samba beats" and "the occasional 'Schwoop!' sound you might recognize from a departing iMessage"

Release
On 20 June 2020, Robyn released "Beach 2k20" on a limited edition 12" vinyl featuring remixes of the song along with "Between the Lines". It was released as part of a Honey Remix vinyl series, alongside "Honey", "Baby Forgive Me" and "Ever Again", for the Love Record Stores Day 2020 event. Only 500 of each were manufactured.

Track listing

Personnel
Credits adapted from the liner notes of Honey.
 Robyn – vocals, vocal arranging, songwriting, vocal recording
 Joseph Mount – bass guitar, additional synthesizer programming, vocal arranging songwriting, vocal recording
 Klas Åhlund - songwriting
 Mr. Tophat (Rudolf Nordström) - vocal arranging, songwriting, production, vocal recording
 Ludvig Larsson - studio assistance
 NealHPogue – mixing
 Mike Bozzi – mastering

Charts

References

2019 singles
2018 songs
Robyn songs
Songs written by Robyn
Songs written by Klas Åhlund
Songs written by Joseph Mount